Kuštica is a village in the municipality of Bujanovac, Serbia. According to the 2002 census, the town has a population of 175 people.

References

Populated places in Pčinja District